The Bucaramanga Nest is a seismic region located in Colombia. It is named after Bucaramanga, Santander.

External links 
 Study faults a ‘runaway’ mechanism in intermediate-depth earthquakes

Geology of Colombia
Geography of Santander Department
Earthquake swarms
Earthquakes in Colombia